Al Riyadh (812) is an  of the Royal Saudi Navy.

Development and design 

The ships' combat system, produced by Armaris (a Direction des Constructions Navales/Thales Group joint venture), is armed with Aster 15 surface-to-air missiles (SAM) launched from SYLVER vertical launchers (SYLVER - SYstème de Lancement VERtical). As with the La Fayette class, the primary offensive weapon is the anti-surface Exocet missile. The ships' main gun is the OTO Melara 76 mm super-rapid firing gun replacing the modèle 100 TR  automatic gun of the La Fayette class. There are also four aft-mounted  torpedo tubes, firing DTCN F17 heavyweight anti-submarine torpedoes.

Construction and career 
Al Riyadh was launched on 1 August 2000 at the DCNS dockyard in Lorient and commissioned on 26 July 2002.

Al Riyadh-class frigates
Three Al Riyadh class frigates have been built:
 Al Riyadh (812) the lead ship commissioned in 2002
 Makkah (814) commissioned in 2004
 Al Dammam (816) commissioned in 2004

References 

2000 ships
Ships built in France
Ships of the Royal Saudi Navy
Al Riyadh-class frigates